Ancient Future may refer to:

 Ancient Future (group), a musical ensemble popular in the world music genre
 Ancient Future (album), an album by American band Warrior
 A series of books by Robert E. Webber
 Ancient Future Churches, otherwise known as the Paleo-orthodoxy of Protestant Christianity